The Panic of 1910–1911 was a minor economic depression that followed the enforcement of the Sherman Antitrust Act, which regulates the competition among enterprises, trying to avoid monopolies and, generally speaking, a failure of the market itself. The short-term panic lasted approximately 1 year and led to a drop of the major U.S. stock market index by ~26%. It mostly affected the stock market and business traders who were smarting from the activities of trust busters, especially with the breakup of the Standard Oil Company and the American Tobacco company.

See also
 Van Schaick and Company, one of several investment firms that failed during this period.
Great Depression

References

1910 in the United States
1911 in the United States
Economic crises in the United States
Financial crises
1910 in economics
1911 in economics